George E. Terwilleger (February 3, 1941 – February 26, 2012) was a member of the Ohio House of Representatives from 1993 to 2000.  His district consisted of a portion of Warren County, Ohio.  He was succeeded by Tom Raga.  A bridge in Foster, Ohio, where the Old 3-C Highway crosses the Little Miami River, is named in his honor.

Education
George E. Terwilleger received his education from the following institution:
AA, Business Administration, Xavier University

Political Experience
George Terwilleger has had the following political experience:
Hamilton Twp. trustee Twp. clerk Warren Co. commissioner

Organizations
George Terwilleger has been a member of the following organizations:
Area Progress Council
Clinton/Warren Cos. Solid Waste Policy Comm., Chair
County Commissioners Association of Ohio Board
Co. Association of Trustees, President
Co. Reg. Planning Commission
Ohio Public Works, Vice-chair
National Association of Counties
National Association of Towns and Townships
Scottish Rite Club, president
Warren Co. Board of Realtors, director and president
Worthy Patron of the Morrow Chapter Order of Eastern Stars

References

1941 births
2012 deaths
Republican Party members of the Ohio House of Representatives
People from Cozaddale, Ohio